Voyage of the Basset is a fantasy novel published in 1996. It was written and illustrated by James C. Christensen in collaboration with Renwick St. James and Alan Dean Foster. It is about a widowed Victorian era professor, Algernon Aisling, his two daughters, Miranda and Cassandra, and their adventure on a ship called the Basset.

Plot summary
Miranda is sixteen and concerned with being sensible, while Cassandra, nine years and eleven months, likes and believes in magical things. Miranda is outnumbered in this family, because Professor Aisling lectures on mythology and legends at his university, and believes in mysterious and magical things too.

But some of the members of the university think that it is nonsense to teach about myths and legends, because magical and mysterious things cannot be dissected, weighed and measured. One member in particular, Mr. Bilgewallow, takes delight in tormenting Professor Aisling, who wishes, and dreams, of a ship that would take him to the worlds where he might find the creatures of legend.

One evening, his wish comes true. As he and his daughters walk along the river, they come across a curious little ship, with a crew of dwarfs and gremlins. One of the dwarfs introduces himself as Malachi, captain of H.M.S. Basset. He says that it is Professor Aisling's ship, conjured from his wishes and ready to sail on the "tides of inspiration". Aisling is astonished and delighted, and he and Cassandra waste no time in going aboard. Miranda needs a bit more coaxing.

The Aislings set sail on a magical voyage where they meet a number of creatures from mythology that join them on board the ship. Their first stop is the island of fairies, where the crew are approached by Oberon and Titania, who present them gifts to help them on their journey. The manticore, who guarded the entrance of the fairy king and queen, joins them along with the sphinx, who Cassandra thinks they both love each other. The crew next include among them the harpies, who take over the galley, the minotaur and a dryad, complete with a tree. Disaster strikes when Aisling becomes distracted by the potential of bringing back measurable proof for Bilgewallow and his ilk, which is a dragon skull he steals from Skotos, who lives on the island of the trolls. He also insists on bringing the lovely but deadly Medusa on board, with predictable results for one of the crew. But through the help of his daughters and Medusa, he recovers his belief and his balance, as all of them must unite against the evil trolls, who pursue him. They visit the island, where the Wonderful College of Magical Knowledge is to find out how to change Sebastian back from stone to normal. They find out that a unicorn can break the curse, so they set off to the island, where the ogre Olaf is having his birthday. They give him a deck of cards as a present, and then Olaf leads them to the forest, where Miranda dresses in a beautiful dress to call upon the unicorn, who changes Sebastian back to normal. They are attacked by the trolls, who seek revenge on professor Aisling for stealing their dragon skull. The trolls are defeated by a dragon, who burns their leader Skotos. They head back to the island of fairies, where their victory is celebrated by King Oberon and Queen Titantia. King Oberon presents the dragon skull to Professor Ailsing, who instead gives it to the dragon, feeling there is no need to prove existence of magical creatures. The Professor seeks an island to leave all the magical creatures there and live together, who they say their sad goodbyes. Professor Aisling, Miranda, and Cassandra go home sad that they have to leave their friends but happy they have made them.

Controversy

The Voyage of the Basset was the source of controversy in 2006 when a resident of Bountiful, Utah, demanded that the book be removed from circulation from the young adult section at the Davis County Library in nearby Farmington, Utah because some of the illustrations were deemed too suggestive. The Davis County Library Board voted to keep the book in circulation in the young adult section.

Tagline 

Credendo vides - "By believing, one sees."

Quotes 
"One evening late in April 1850, the Aisling family's world got turned upside down..."

Adaptations 
 The 2001 TV movie Voyage of the Unicorn is based on this book. Aired in two parts, it is set in the modern era, with certain elements of the book being altered or removed due to budgetary constraints.
 The book Islands In The Sky by Tanith Lee is the first of a series of books based on the original story. The other books are The Raven Queen by Ellen Steiber and Terri Windling (October 1999), Journey To Otherwhere by Sherwood Smith (August 2000), Thor's Hammer by Will Shetterly (December 2000), and Fire Bird by Mary Frances Zambreno (June 2001).

References

 Scanlon, Donna. Voyage of the Basset Rambles, A Cultural Arts Magazine. Accessed February 21, 2007.
 Series Information: Voyage of the Basset. Internet Book List. Accessed February 21, 2007.
 

American fantasy novels
American novels adapted into films
American picture books
1996 American novels